Discography of Ariel Rivera

Albums

Singles
Sana Kahit Minsan (OST of Sana Kahit Minsan) "also covered by Pilita Corrales, Wynn Andrada, Lani Misalucha, Kamikazee & Hong Kong Singer Jackie Cheung & American Saxophonist Warren Hill"
Mahal Na Mahal Kita (OST of Shotgun Banjo)
Ayoko Na Sana (also covered by Martin Nievera)
Simple Lang
Without Your Love
Wala Kang Katulad 
Minsan Lang Kitang Iibigin (also covered by Gary V.)
Narito Ako
Photograph
Sa Aking Puso
Getting to Know Each Other
Sana Ngayong Pasko (OST of Sana Ngayong Pasko) "also covered by Jed Madela, Moira Dela Torre, Sarah Geronimo, Jovi Baldovino, Juris Fernandez, Daryl Ong, Erik Santos, Darren Espanto, Ronnie Liang, Jolina Magdangal, Silent Sanctuary, Lian Kyla, Lea Salonga, Sharon Cuneta, Heart Evangelista, Lie Reposposa, Piolo Pascual, Kristofer Martin"
Silent Night Na Naman "also covered by Geraldine Roxas and Sexbomb Girls"
A Smile In Your Heart (original by Jam Morales)
One More Gift (original by Bukas Palad)
In My Life (Music & Lyrics by Raymund Ryan Santes)
Tell Me (feat. Regine Velasquez-Alcasid) "original by Joey Albert, also covered by Side A & Gary V."
Ngayon at Kailanman (original by Basil Valdez, also covered by Jona Viray)
Tunay Na Ligaya (original by Basil Valdez)

References

External links

 
Discographies of Filipino artists
Pop music discographies
Rhythm and blues discographies